Antonio Caballero may refer to:
Antonio Caballero y Góngora (1723–1796), Spanish archbishop
Antonio Caballero (boxer) (born 1967), Spanish boxer
Antonio Caballero (footballer) (born 1994), Spanish footballer